KAFX-FM (95.5 FM) is a radio station that airs a Top 40 (CHR) format in the Lufkin and Nacogdoches, Texas areas. The station is owned by Townsquare Media and is licensed to Diboll, Texas.

External links 

 K-FOX 95.5 official website
 Kidd Kraddick In The Morning
 

AFX
Contemporary hit radio stations in the United States
Radio stations established in 1986
1986 establishments in Texas
Townsquare Media radio stations